Cornelius Van Wyck Lawrence (February 28, 1791 – February 20, 1861) was a politician from New York. He became the first popularly elected mayor of New York City after the law was changed in 1834.

Early life
Lawrence was born in Flushing, New York, on February 28, 1791.  He was a cousin of Effingham Lawrence and was a descendant of John Lawrence and John Bowne, both Quakers and pioneer English settlers of Queens.

Lawrence attended the public schools and worked on his father's farm.  He moved to New York City in 1812 to embark on a business career, first at the Shotwell, Hicks & Co. auctioneering firm, and later as a partner in the wholesale dry goods firm of Hicks, Lawrence & Co.

Career
Lawrence was elected as a Jacksonian to the Twenty-third Congress, serving from March 4, 1833, to May 14, 1834, when he resigned, becoming mayor of New York (1834–1837). He also served as director in several banks and trust companies and, was president of the Bank of the State of New York for more than 20 years.  From 1845 to 1849, Lawrence served as Collector of the Port of New York.

Personal life
He had a son, James Ogden Lawrence (died August 1, 1904).

Lawrence died in Flushing (the same place he was born in) on February 20, 1861, 8 days shy of his 70th birthday. He was interred in the family burying ground in Bayside, New York.

References

External links

Cornelius Van Wyck Lawrence at The Political Graveyard

Mayors of New York City
1791 births
1861 deaths
American people of Dutch descent
Collectors of the Port of New York
Jacksonian members of the United States House of Representatives from New York (state)
19th-century American politicians
Members of the United States House of Representatives from New York (state)
People from Flushing, Queens